Lieutenant Louis Fernand Coudouret was a World War I flying ace credited with six aerial victories over a two-year period from 4 May 1916 to 2 June 1918.

Birth
Louis Fernand Couderet was born on 31 May 1896 in Marseilles, France.

Career 
On 15 December 1914, he volunteered for military service, and was assigned to aviation duty. On 14 April 1915, he reported for pilot training; he received Military Pilot's Brevet No. 1020 on 1 June 1915. Sent to active flying duty on 28 April 1916, he shuttled among five Western Front squadrons, scoring an aerial victory apiece for two of them while rising through the enlisted ranks.

On 1 February 1917, he was transferred to the Military Mission in Russia. Ten days later, he was commissioned as a temporary Sous lieutenant. While serving on the Eastern Front, he won three more triumphs in late 1917. On 1 April 1918, he was transferred back to the Western Front. Assigned to Escadrille 103 on 18 May 1918, he scored his sixth and final victory on 2 June.

Atlantic flight, accident and death 
He left the army in 1928 and planned to cross the Atlantic Ocean from Paris to New York with his Russian friends Count Louis de Mailly-Nesle, and Captain Louis Mailloux. They used a plane invented by Jean Hubert. However, the Spanish Air Ministry informed him that he was not granted permission to perform a flight from Paris to Seville to New York. He decided to return to Angoulême. However, at 500 metres, he lost control of the ship due to engine failure at Saint-Amant-de-Bonnieure. Both passengers survived, but the pilot died from his injuries hours after the crash.

References

1896 births
1929 deaths
French World War I flying aces
Recipients of the Distinguished Conduct Medal